The 2021–22 Western Michigan Broncos men's ice hockey season was the 48th season of play for the program and the 9th season in the NCHC conference. They were coached by Pat Ferschweiler, in his first season, and played their home games at Lawson Arena.

Season
Western Michigan began the Pat Ferschweiler era in fine form, winning six of its first seven games. The team earned a signature win early on when it defeated top-ranked Michigan after jumping up into the national rankings. The Broncos ran into a bit of trouble in mid-November but then reeled off seven consecutive victories to push it up into the top-5. WMU recorded more wins in the first half of the season than they had all of the previous year. While this is a bit misleading as the team's schedule was curtailed by the COVID-19 pandemic, the offense was rolling along to the tune of almost four goals a game when they paused for the winter break. The Bronco attack was led by Drew Worrad, Ethen Frank and Ronnie Attard. The trio put the team in a position to win most nights with Brandon Bussi providing capable goaltending when needed.

Expectations were high for the team as it was getting ready for the Great Lakes Invitational. Unfortunately, COVID got in the way once more and forced what was supposed to be the rubber match with Michigan to be cancelled. The team then suffered a bigger blow when team captain Paul Washe left the club, though administrators were tight-lipped about the reasons at the time. Coronavirus put the team on the shelf until the third week of January. When they returned, however, the Broncos didn't appear to have lost any of their fight and put together another impressive stretch with 5 wins in 6 games.

The good times came to an abrupt halt in mid-February when the Broncos went 1–4–1 as they headed down the stretch. The offense dried up for a three week span and dropped WMU out of contention for the conference regular season title. While they recovered in the final week of the season, albeit against the NCHC's worst team, Western Michigan ended up 3rd in the conference. More importantly, however, because the team had such a high ranking from their success before the losing skid, the Broncos were guaranteed to earn a bid to the NCAA tournament.

Postseason
The Broncos began their run against Omaha and, once more, their offense carried them to victory. A hat-trick by Luke Grainger was the difference in the first game while Worrad chipped in the final two WMU goals in the rematch. The defense firmed up in the semifinal and enabled the team to down tournament-bound North Dakota 4–2. In Western Michigan's first appearance in the NCHC title game, they met one of the stingiest defenses in Minnesota Duluth. The Broncos were only able to get 19 shots on goal in the contest and none of them could find their way into the cage.

Though the team was disappointed by the result, their championship game appearance earned the Broncos a top-3 national ranking. That gave them one of the #1 seeds and they were sent to Worcester to take on Northeastern. While this was Western Michigan's seventh appearance in the national tournament, the team had still yet to win a single game. Not wanting history to repeat, WMU immediately went on the attack after the puck was dropped and tried to steamroll the Huskies. Northeastern replied in kind and the two teams skated up and down the ice, looking to break through. Western got on the board first, scoring in the later half of the opening period, but stellar goaltending from Devon Levi prevented the Broncos from increasing their advantage. Instead, the team held onto a slim lead for most of the contest while the Huskies attacked relentlessly. Bussi was up to the task, turning aside every Northeastern shot and putting the team in position to win. With just a few minutes remaining in regulation, Northeastern stole the puck at the Broncos' blueline and Aidan McDonough, one of the top goal scorers in the nation, broke towards the WMU net. He slipped around a fallen Jacob Bauer and then shuffled the puck around a sprawled-out Bussi to tie the score. When overtime began, both teams continued their attack and, at about the 90-second mark, Levi made a mistake behind his own net but appeared to make up for the gaffe with a spectacular save. However, upon video review, the puck was confirmed to have completely crossed the line and Luke Grainger became the hero of the Broncos first ever tournament victory.

Their second game of the tournament came against Minnesota and that contest was much different than the first. The Gophers hemmed the Broncos in their own zone for long stretches of the game and didn't allow WMU to get its powerful offense going. Minnesota opened the scoring in the first and seemed comfortable holding the small lead. Attard appeared to tie the score in the middle of the second, however, the goal was waved off due to offsides and left Western's offense stuck in neutral. The Broncos' only penalty of the game almost immediately resulted in a Gopher power play goal and appeared to seal the team's fate. An empty-net goal washed away all doubt and sent the Broncos home.

While the end to their season was disappointing, this was still the furthest the Broncos had ever gotten in the postseason and ending a 7-game losing streak in NCAA play is an achievement in and of itself.

Rape allegations
Just prior to the postseason, Paul Washe was formally charged with sexual assault. Reportedly, the incident occurred at a party on December 5. The unnamed victim, also a WMU student, testified that Washe had led her into a basement and into a secluded corner. Despite repeated attempts to rebuke his advances, she said Washe forced her down and made her perform oral sex. He then pulled her up and raped her. The victim reported the alleged crime three days later and an investigation was launched. By early January, enough evidence had been uncovered to cause the school to suspend Washe, who had previously been investigated for Title IX accusations 4 years earlier.

After news of indictment was made public, Washe was formally dismissed from the team. In May of 2022, a judge ruled that there was sufficient evidence to send the case to trial.

Departures

Recruiting

Roster
As of March 22, 2022.

Standings

Schedule and results

|-
!colspan=12 style=";" | Exhibition

|-
!colspan=12 style=";" | Regular season

|-
!colspan=12 style=";" | 

|- style="background:#bbbbbb"
| December 30
| 7:00 PM
| #3 Michigan*
| align=center|#4
| Yost Ice Arena • Ann Arbor, MI (Great Lakes Invitational)
| colspan=5 rowspan=1 style="text-align:center"|Cancelled due to the COVID-19 pandemic
|-
!colspan=12 style=";" | Regular season

|-
!colspan=12 style=";" | 

|- align="center" bgcolor="#e0e0e0"
|colspan=12|Western Michigan Won Series 2–0

|-
!colspan=12 style=";" |

Scoring statistics

Goaltending statistics

Rankings

Note: USCHO did not release a poll in week 24.

Awards and honors

References

2021–22
Western Michigan Broncos
Western Michigan Broncos
Western Michigan Broncos
Western Michigan Broncos